Gillian Chan may refer to:

Gillian Chan (born 1954), Canadian children's author
Gillian Chan (model) (born 1996), Playboy Playmate of the Month for November 2019

See also
 Chan (surname)